Fernand Blaise (7 February 1925 – 10 February 1991) was a Belgian footballer. He played in one match for the Belgium national football team in 1953. He was also named in Belgium's squad for the Group 2 qualification tournament for the 1954 FIFA World Cup.

References

External links
 

1925 births
1991 deaths
Belgian footballers
Belgium international footballers
Place of birth missing
Association football defenders
Standard Liège players